The BEANO T-13 hand grenade was an experimental grenade developed by the Office of Strategic Services (which later became the CIA), with assistance from Eastman Kodak Corporation, in the latter years of World War II.

Concept 
The concept for the BEANO hand grenade was that a spherical grenade the size and weight of a common baseball would be effective in the hands of American troops. The designers believed that by emulating a baseball, any young American man should be able to properly throw the grenade with both accuracy and distance.

Design 
The final design for the T-13 hand grenade utilized a pressure trigger as well as an in-flight arming device. The grenade was designed to be thrown as a traditional baseball, and as such it was held with two fingers on a weighted and knurled "butterfly cap" and the arming pin was removed. Once thrown, the cap detached from the body of the grenade and a length of nylon string unwound until a secondary arming pin attached to the far end of the cord was pulled, arming the grenade to detonate upon impact with a hard surface.

Usage  
The T-13 was approved for field use, and several thousand (produced by Eastman Kodak Corporation) were shipped to Europe. It was reportedly issued in limited quantities during the invasion of Normandy, but is believed to have injured more American soldiers than enemy troops due to premature detonation.

Collectability 
Due to the timing of its development, and lack of deployment into service the T-13 remains one of the rarest and most sought after World War II grenades.  At the war's end, the remaining stock was ordered destroyed and the records classified.  While there are T-13s in existence, they are rare, and command top price in their class.

Literature 
   A novel.  .

Hand grenades of the United States
World War II infantry weapons of the United States
Office of Strategic Services
Kodak
Weapon development
Military equipment introduced in the 1940s